Andrew Michael Holness,  (born 22 July 1972) is a Jamaican politician who has been the Prime Minister of Jamaica since 3 March 2016, following the 2016 Jamaican general election. Holness previously served as prime minister from October 2011 to 5 January 2012. He succeeded Bruce Golding as prime minister, and decided to go to the polls in the 29 December 2011 general election in an attempt to get his own mandate from the Jamaican electorate. He failed in that bid, however, losing to the People's National Party led by Portia Simpson-Miller, with the PNP gaining 42 seats to the Jamaica Labour Party's 21. Following that defeat, Holness served as Leader of the Opposition from January 2012 to March 2016, when he once again assumed the position of prime minister. In 2020, the Labour Party won a landslide in another general election, and on 7 September Holness was sworn in for another term as prime minister.

In October 2011, at the age of 39, Holness became the youngest person ever to be prime minister in Jamaica's history. In March 2016, aged 43, he became the youngest to ever be elected prime minister. He is also the first prime minister to have been born after Jamaica gained independence in 1962.

Early life
Andrew Holness is a graduate of St. Catherine High School and of the University of the West Indies, where he pursued a Bachelor of Science in Management Studies and a Master of Science in Development Studies. In 1997 he married Juliet Holness (née Landell), an accountant, whom he had met as a student at St. Catherine High School during the 1980s. The couple have two children, Adam and Matthew.

Holness served as Executive Director at the Voluntary Organization for Uplifting Children from 1994 to 1996 and then joined the Premium Group of Companies, acting as a special assistant to Edward Seaga.

He is a member of the Seventh-day Adventist Church.

Political career
In 1997, he became a Member of Parliament for West Central St. Andrew and served as Opposition Spokesperson on Land and Development from 1999 to 2002. In 2002, he switched portfolio to Housing and then Education in 2005. He was sworn in as Minister of Education in September 2007.

Prime Minister of Jamaica 
He succeeded Bruce Golding as both leader of the JLP and prime minister on 23 October 2011, making him the ninth person to hold the office. As prime minister, he chose to retain the education portfolio. In February 2023, a commission cleared him of corruption allegations of which he was accused.

2011 elections

On 5 December 2011, Holness called an election set for 29 December 2011. The JLP campaigned in its strongholds, and Holness highlighted the accomplishments during the four years of JLP government, such as economic growth and crime reduction, which the JLP said the PNP failed to do during its own eighteen years' rule of the country.

The JLP, however, lost the election to the PNP, which gained a large majority of 42 to the JLP's 21 parliamentary seats. Portia Simpson-Miller and the PNP returned to power. The voter turnout was 53.17%.

2016 elections and re-appointment as Prime Minister

On 25 February 2016, the JLP won the 2016 election winning 32 seats compared to 31 seats for the incumbent PNP. His wife Juliet also won a seat in parliament, the first time a prime minister or opposition leader and their spouse sat simultaneously in the Parliament of Jamaica. As a result, Simpson-Miller became Opposition Leader for a second time. The voter turnout dipped below 50% for the first time, registering just 48.37%.

2020 elections 

On 3 September 2020, Holness led the JLP to a second consecutive general election victory, but this time by a much larger margin. The JLP won 49 seats, as compared to the 14 seats for the PNP. However, the turnout was just 37%, probably affected by the coronavirus pandemic. With this victory, he became the youngest person in Jamaica's history to be elected twice. He was sworn in for another term on 7 September 2020.

Republicanism 
During the Duke and Duchess of Cambridge's tour of Jamaica in March 2022, on behalf of the Jamaican monarch, Queen Elizabeth II, and as part of the celebrations of the 70th anniversary of her accession, Holness told the royal couple that their nation was "moving on and we intend to attain in short order our development goals and fulfil our true ambitions as an independent, developed, prosperous country".

Honours

National honours
:
 Member of the Order of the Nation

Foreign honours
:
 Grand Cross with Gold Breast Star of the Order of Merit of Duarte, Sánchez and Mella

:
 26 May 2021: Member of Her Majesty's Most Honourable Privy Council (PC)

See also
 Cabinet of Jamaica

References

External links

 Profile
 Jis Page
 About Jamaica - Official Jamaican Guide
 Juliet joins husband Andrew in Parliament 

|-

|-

|-

|-

1972 births
Living people
University of the West Indies alumni
Education Ministers of Jamaica
Government ministers of Jamaica
Jamaica Labour Party politicians
Jamaican Seventh-day Adventists
Recipients of the Order of the Nation
Jamaican members of the Privy Council of the United Kingdom
Members of the House of Representatives of Jamaica
People from Spanish Town
Prime Ministers of Jamaica
Jamaican republicans
Members of the 14th Parliament of Jamaica
21st-century Jamaican politicians